Musha-e is a type a Japanese art that was developed in the late 18th century. It is a genre of the ukiyo-e woodblock printing technique, and represents images of warriors and samurai from Japanese history and mythology.

History

Edo Period 
The earliest examples of musha-e were created in the late 18th century as illustrations for classical stories of Japanese literature. During that period, artists like Masanobu Okumura were prominent. As the ukiyo-e technique thrived during the 19th century, musha-e became more popular. Kuniyoshi, a famous printmaker, specialized in warrior images and produced a series of prints known as the 108 Heroes of the Suikoden. During the late Edo period, censorship laws passed by the Tokugawa Shogunate made the creation of musha-e more difficult. Artists and publishers therefore often changed the names of characters or events depicted. Artists from the Utagawa School such as Kunisada or Hiroshige produced many musha-e prints.

Meiji Period and after 
As the Tokugawa Shogun was overruled by the Meiji Emperor, the rapid Westernisation of Japan brought many changes in society. Nationalism grew considerably, and the epic history of Japanese warfare was brought to a new light. Artist Yoshitoshi Tsukioka produced several musha-e depicting generals and heroes of Japan.

As the country grew militarized, musha-e shifted from depictions of legendary warriors to actual soldiers and generals. By the beginning of the 20th century, this shift led the creation of a new style, senso-e, meaning "images of war".

Gallery

References 

Ukiyo-e genres